Vittori is a surname. Notable people with the surname include:

Arturo Vittori (born 1971), Italian architect
Carlo Vittori (1931–2015), Italian sprinter and athletics coach
Carlo Roberti de' Vittori (1605–1673), Italian Roman Catholic cardinal
Dario Vittori (1921–2001), Argentine actor
Gail Vittori (born 1954), co-director of the Center for Maximum Potential Building Systems
Girolamo Vittori (17th century), Italian Hispanist and lexicographer
Joseph Vittori (1929–1951), United States Marine
Loreto Vittori, Italian castrato and composer
Nicolò Vittori (1909–1988), Italian rower
Paolo Vittori (born 1938), Italian basketball player and coach
Pascal Vittori (born 1966), New Caledonian politician
Roberto Vittori (born 1964), Italian air force officer and astronaut
Umberto Vittori (1906 – ?), Italian rower

See also 
 Vittorini
 Di Vittorio

Italian-language surnames